Russia national football team had made only in one sole occasion, the 2017 FIFA Confederations Cup as Russia was awarded as host of the 2018 FIFA World Cup in 2010. This was the first, and also the last time Russia participated in the tournament, as the edition was the last edition of the FIFA Confederations Cup.

Record

Russia 2017

Top goalscorers
Russia scored three goals in the tournament, however one was an own goal.

References

Countries at the FIFA Confederations Cup
Russia national football team